Tony M. Brown Jr. (born July 13, 1995) is an American football cornerback for the Indianapolis Colts of the National Football League. He played college football at Alabama, and signed as an undrafted free agent with the Los Angeles Chargers in 2018.

High school career
Brown attended Clifton J. Ozen High School in Beaumont, Texas, where he played football and was a world-class athlete. As a freshman in 2010, he made 95 tackles, had one interception and 15 passes broken up. As a sophomore in 2011, he had 96 stops and three interceptions, while adding a fumble recovery and 16 pass breakups.

Track
Also an accomplished track athlete, Brown won a silver medal in the 110-meter hurdles at the 2013 Pan American Junior Championships in Medellin, Colombia. He lost to Colombian Juan Carlos Moreno, who established a new South American Junior record at 13.42. Brown was named to the USA Today All-American Track and Field Team. At the 2013 Texas Class 4A Meet, he won the state title in the 110-meter hurdles (13.63 s), and took third in the 100 meters (10.37 s). He ran a personal-best of 7.76 seconds in the indoor 60m hurdles, the fastest time in the nation in 2013. He ran a PR of 13.38 seconds in the 110m hurdles at the 2013 Texas Relays, the top time in the U.S. in 2013. He won the 110m hurdles at the 2013 USATF National Junior Olympics (13.88 s) and the USATF Junior Nationals (13.69 s). He also recorded a personal-best time of 37.32 seconds in the 300m hurdles at the 2012 Texas Class 4A Meet, where he placed first.

Recruiting
Considered a five-star recruit by ESPN.com, Brown was listed as the No. 2 cornerback in the nation in 2014.

Brown committed to Alabama at the 2014 Under Armour All-America Game.

College career
Brown graduated early from high school and enrolled at the University of Alabama in January 2014, where he began participating in football and track and field. He improved his 100 meters time to 10.12 seconds in the NCAA semi-finals. On January 18, 2014, he was arrested in Tuscaloosa, Alabama. On December 31, 2015, he was suspended and sent home for starting a fight while preparing for the 2015 Cotton Bowl.

Professional career

Los Angeles Chargers
Despite running a 4.35 second 40 yard dash, the third fastest at the combine, Brown went undrafted in the 2018 NFL Draft. He signed with the Los Angeles Chargers as an undrafted free agent following the 2018 NFL Draft on April 28, 2018. He was waived on September 1, 2018.

Green Bay Packers
On September 3, 2018, Brown was signed to the Green Bay Packers' practice squad. He was promoted to the active roster on September 29, 2018. Brown was released on December 28, 2019.

Cincinnati Bengals
On December 30, 2019, Brown was claimed off waivers by the Cincinnati Bengals, his rights will be awarded to the Bengals after Super Bowl LIV. He signed a one-year contract extension with the team on March 12, 2020. He was named a backup cornerback to start the 2020 season. He made his first career start in Week 10, recording six tackles, two for a loss, and a pass deflection. He was placed on injured reserve on December 5, 2020. On December 26, 2020, Brown was activated off of injured reserve.

Brown re-signed with the Bengals on another one-year contract on March 18, 2021. He was waived on August 31, 2021, and re-signed to the practice squad the next day. He was released on October 5.

Las Vegas Raiders
On October 13, 2021, Brown was signed to the Las Vegas Raiders practice squad. He was released on November 1, but later re-signed on December 23.

Indianapolis Colts
On March 8, 2022, Brown signed with the Indianapolis Colts. He was waived on August 31, 2022, and re-signed to the practice squad. He was promoted to the active roster on September 13.

Brown re-signed with the Colts on a one-year contract on March 16, 2023.

NFL career statistics

References

External links

Alabama Crimson Tide bio

1995 births
Living people
Players of American football from Texas
Sportspeople from Beaumont, Texas
Alabama Crimson Tide football players
American football defensive backs
Green Bay Packers players
Los Angeles Chargers players
Cincinnati Bengals players
Las Vegas Raiders players
Indianapolis Colts players